Cecil McKew (12 August 1887 – 12 October 1974) was an Australian cricketer. He played twelve first-class matches for New South Wales between 1911/12 and 1913/14.

See also
 List of New South Wales representative cricketers

References

External links
 

1887 births
1974 deaths
Australian cricketers
New South Wales cricketers
Cricketers from Sydney